Daniel Saul Goldin (born July 23, 1940) served as the 9th and longest-tenured Administrator of NASA from April 1, 1992, to November 17, 2001. He was appointed by President George H. W. Bush and also served under Presidents Bill Clinton and George W. Bush. He is an entrepreneur and technologist. Most recently he is the founder of Cold Canyon AI, an innovation advisory company. His career has spanned numerous technologies and businesses in space science, aeronautics, national security, semiconductors, and artificial intelligence.

Early life
Born in New York City, Goldin earned a Bachelor of Science degree in mechanical engineering from the City College of New York in 1962.

Career
He began his career at NASA's Glenn Research Center in Cleveland, Ohio that year (1962), and worked on electric propulsion systems for human interplanetary travel. Goldin left NASA after five years to work at the TRW Space and Technology Group in Redondo Beach, California. Goldin spent 25 years at TRW, climbing to the position of Vice President and General Manager.

He was NASA Administrator from 1992 to 2001, and was known for his support for a "Faster, better, cheaper" philosophy. He encouraged the team defining what would become JWST to use a larger beryllium mirror.

References

External links
NASA biography of Daniel Saul Goldin

1940 births
Living people
Administrators of NASA
City College of New York alumni
People from the Bronx
Recipients of the Great Cross of the National Order of Scientific Merit (Brazil)
Members of the United States National Academy of Engineering
George W. Bush administration personnel
Clinton administration personnel
George H. W. Bush administration personnel